Christie Bryant (born July, 14th 1979) is a former Representative for the 32nd district of the Ohio House of Representatives.  Bryant is a native of Cincinnati, and made her first run for public office in 2014 for the Ohio House to succeed Dale Mallory, who was term-limited.  She attended Walnut Hills High School and the University of Cincinnati, for both an undergraduate degree and for a juris doctor. Unopposed for the primary, Bryant went on to win the general election against Republican opponent Brian McIntosh with over 70% of the vote. She did not seek re-election in 2016.

References

Links
Official campaign site

1965 births
Living people
Democratic Party members of the Ohio House of Representatives
Women state legislators in Ohio
Politicians from Cincinnati
University of Cincinnati alumni
African-American women in politics
African-American state legislators in Ohio
21st-century American politicians
21st-century American women politicians
21st-century African-American women
21st-century African-American politicians
20th-century African-American people
20th-century African-American women